The 2014 World Series of Darts was the second staging of the World Series of Darts tour organised by the Professional Darts Corporation. There were four events of the tour, held in Dubai, Singapore, Perth, and Sydney. The four tournaments featured two different formats. They all featured the top six players on the Order of Merit joined by two PDC wildcards. The Perth and Sydney tournaments also featured eight regional qualifiers.

Prize money 
The total prize fund for the tour was £396,000.

World Series events

Quarter-finalists

References 

World Series of Darts